The North American Masters Tournament is a Go competition.

Outline
The North American Masters Tournament is a tournament held in North America where players in America competed. It was the first professional Go tournament to be held in North America and is unusual in that it is mostly played over the internet.

Past winners

Go competitions in North America